Raymond St. Jacques (born James Arthur Johnson; March 1, 1930 – August 27, 1990) was an American actor, director and producer whose career spanned over thirty years on stage, film and television. St. Jacques is noted as the first African American actor to appear in a regular role on a western series, portraying Simon Blake on the eighth season of Rawhide (1965–1966).

Early life and education 
St. Jacques was born James Arthur Johnson in Hartford, Connecticut. He had a sister, Barbara Ann. Shortly after his birth, his parents divorced; he moved with his mother and sister to New Haven, Connecticut. St. Jacques' mother Vivienne later worked as a medical technician at Yale University. After graduating from Hillhouse High School, St. Jacques attended Yale, where he studied drama and psychology. Upon graduation, he worked as an assistant director, actor and fencing instructor for the American Shakespearean Festival in New Haven. St. Jacques staged all of the fencing scenes and duels while at the company and would continue to practice fencing for the rest of his life.

After moving to New York City, St. Jacques continued to pursue acting and studied at the Actors Studio. To support himself, he worked as a model, dishwasher and a busboy. St. Jacques first professional acting role was in the off-Broadway play High Name Today. St. Jacques was cast in the role of "Judge" in the off-Broadway performance of Jean Genet's play The Blacks at St. Mark's Playhouse in 1960.

Career
After appearing in bit parts on television in the early 1960s, St. Jacques made his film debut in a small part in the 1964 film Black Like Me. He followed with a role in The Pawnbroker later that year. He appeared in supporting roles in  The Comedians (1967) and The Green Berets (1968). St. Jacques best-known film roles were that of Coffin Ed in the blaxploitation classics Cotton Comes to Harlem (1970) (adapted from crime novels by Chester Himes) and Come Back, Charleston Blue (1972). In the early 1970s, St. Jacques began teaching fencing and acting at the Mafundi Institute in Watts, Los Angeles. In 1973, he produced, directed, and starred in the crime film Book of Numbers. 

During the 1960s, St. Jacques also guest starred on numerous television shows including East Side/West Side, Daktari, The Virginian, and The Man from U.N.C.L.E.. In 1965, he was cast as "Simon Blake" in the Western series Rawhide, the first African American actor to ever be cast as a regular on a prime time Western series. Throughout the 1960s and 1970s, St. Jacques continued with roles on stage, film and television. He became known as "The Man of a Thousand Faces" due to the varied parts he played throughout his career. In 1976, St. Jacques starred as Othello in the John Anson Ford Amphitheatre production of the play of the same name. He remained active in stage work throughout his career, touring in productions of Julius Caesar, Romeo and Juliet, A Raisin in the Sun, and the stage adaptation of The Man with the Golden Arm. From 1988 to 1989, St. Jacques had a two-year stint as Judge Clayton C. Thomas on the syndicated TV show Superior Court.  In 1989, he played abolitionist Frederick Douglass in Edward Zwick's Glory. His final film role was in the 1991 science fiction film Timebomb released after his death.

Personal life
St. Jacques was a lifelong bachelor. In August 1969, St. Jacques granted an interview to columnist Earl Wilson and told Wilson of his plans to adopt two African American boys who were six and seven years old. The adoption apparently never happened but, by the early 1970s, St. Jacques claimed to have two older sons, Raymond, Jr and Sterling. In a 1973 interview, St. Jacques claimed that Raymond, Jr was living in Boston. In May 1972, Sterling, then reported to be 22 years old, made news after four men attempted to rob St. Jacques' Bel Air home while St. Jacques was in Dallas. Sterling was allegedly the only person home at the time, and fled after calling police. The four men were apprehended after their getaway car stalled in St. Jacques' driveway. Sterling went on to appear in St. Jacques' 1973 film Book of Numbers. In the mid to late 1970s, Sterling became known as a high fashion model (he was briefly engaged to female model Pat Cleveland), dancer and a frequent New York City nightclub and society fixture. In her 2016 memoir Walking with Muses, Cleveland stated that their engagement came to an end because Sterling was gay. Sometime in the early 1980s, he moved to Europe where he found moderate success as an Italo disco singer. Sterling St Jacques reportedly died of complications of AIDS in 1984 (his death has never been officially confirmed and his true fate remains unknown). However, in a 1988 interview with the Chicago Tribune, St. Jacques still claimed to have two sons and said Sterling was appearing on a television show in Düsseldorf.

Activism
St. Jacques frequently spoke of the prejudices he and other African American actors faced and difficulties in being cast in non-stereotypical, thoughtful roles. He later worked to help African Americans find work behind the camera. In 1977, he publicly criticized the lack of minority actors in Star Wars (which he stated he saw five times) and other science fiction films. St. Jacques was also an activist for African American civil rights. In 1985, he and other protestors were arrested during an anti-apartheid demonstration outside of the South African embassy in Washington, D.C.

Death
On August 27, 1990, St. Jacques died of lymphoma at Cedars-Sinai Medical Center in Los Angeles, California. His funeral was held on August 31 at The Church of the Recessional at Forest Lawn Memorial Park in Glendale, California, after which he was interred at Forest Lawn Memorial Park, Hollywood Hills.

Filmography

References

External links

 
 
 " 'Blast from the Past' with Raymond St. Jacques" for the WGBH series, Say Brother

1930 births
1990 deaths
20th-century American male actors
Activists for African-American civil rights
African-American male actors
African-American film directors
African-American film producers
American film directors
American film producers
American male fencers
American male film actors
American male Shakespearean actors
American male stage actors
American male television actors
Burials at Forest Lawn Memorial Park (Hollywood Hills)
Deaths from cancer in California
Deaths from lymphoma
Drama teachers
Male actors from Hartford, Connecticut
Male Western (genre) film actors
Yale University alumni